Surduc may refer to the following places in Romania:

 Surduc, a commune located in Sălaj County
 Surduc, a village in Copăcel Commune, Bihor County
 Surduc, a village in Iara Commune, Cluj County
 Surduc Pass, a mountain pass in the Gorj and Hunedoara counties of Southwestern Romania
 Surduc (Bega), a river in Timiș County
 Surduc, a tributary of the Crișul Repede in Cluj County
 Surducel, a village in Vârciorog Commune, Bihor County

See also 
 Surdu (disambiguation)
 Surducu (disambiguation)
 Surdila (disambiguation)
 Surdești (disambiguation)